Igor Yurievich Artemyev (born  27 November 1961 in Leningrad, Soviet Union) is a Russian politician and government official.

Biography 
Artemyev graduated from the Leningrad State University Faculty of Biology and from the Faculty of Law of the St. Petersburg State University. According to former opposition leader Marina Salye, Artemyev worked for the KGB during the Soviet era.

On 10 March 2004, Artemyev was appointed the head of the Federal Antimonopoly Service of Russia (FAS) by President Vladimir Putin through presidential decree № 329-р. He served in this role for 16 years, retiring in 2020. Artemyev was replaced in this capacity by Maksim Shaskolsky, the former vice governor of Saint Petersburg.

References

1961 births
Living people
1st class Active State Councillors of the Russian Federation
Members of Legislative Assembly of Saint Petersburg
Academic staff of the Higher School of Economics
Third convocation members of the State Duma (Russian Federation)